They're Trying To Kill Us is a 2021 American documentary film co-directed and produced by John Lewis and Keegan Kuhn. The film was executive produced by NBA All-star Chris Paul and Billie Eilish. Its story explores racial inequality within the food system and how it directly correlates to the rate at which people of color suffer from disproportionately higher rates of chronic disease. It was released on November 11, 2021.

References

External links 

 

2021 films
2021 documentary films
Documentary films about food and drink
2020s English-language films